Lois Paul Maynard (born 22 January 1989) is a professional footballer who plays as a midfielder for Oldham Athletic. Mainly a central midfielder, he also can play as a central defender, right defender or defensive midfielder. Born in England, Maynard represents the Saint Kitts and Nevis national team.

Career
Born in Cheetham Hill, Manchester, Maynard played for Daisy Hill and Chadderton before signing with Flixton in June 2011. He soon established himself as a key defensive unit, being also loaned to Stocksbridge Park Steels (two divisions above), but returning a week later.

In summer 2012, Maynard signed with Winsford United. After a good season he was invited to a trial at Rochdale's training ground. However, nothing came of it; and on 25 July 2013 he signed with F.C. Halifax Town. He scored a career-best 11 goals 2014–15 campaign, and signed a two-year deal with Tranmere Rovers on 28 May 2015.

In May 2017 he signed for Salford City. In May 2019 he extended his contract with the club until at least June 2020.

In February 2020 he signed for Stockport County. Maynard made his debut for Stockport in an 1–1 draw with Dagenham and Redbridge shortly before the 19/20 season was cut short due to coronavirus. Over the extended summer period Maynard became a regular during the clubs preseason fixtures. Maynard scored his first goal for Stockport in a 5-2 victory over Wealdstone.

In the summer of 2022, Oldham Athletic confirmed the signing of Lois Maynard on a one-year contract.

Personal life
Maynard is eligible to play for Saint Kitts and Nevis and has made a number of appearances for them. His cousin is Marcus Rashford of Manchester United.

Honours
Salford City
National League play-offs: 2019

References

External links

1989 births
Living people
People from Cheetham Hill
Footballers from Manchester
English footballers
Saint Kitts and Nevis footballers
Association football defenders
Association football midfielders
Association football utility players
Daisy Hill F.C. players
Chadderton F.C. players
Flixton F.C. players
Winsford United F.C. players
FC Halifax Town players
Tranmere Rovers F.C. players
Salford City F.C. players
Stockport County F.C. players
Solihull Moors F.C. players
Oldham Athletic A.F.C. players
National League (English football) players
English Football League players
Saint Kitts and Nevis international footballers
English sportspeople of Saint Kitts and Nevis descent